Travers Clement was an American socialist writer, politician, and political functionary. He is best remembered as an assistant to Angelica Balabanoff in the writing of her memoirs and for his tenure as the National Executive Secretary of the Socialist Party of America beginning in April 1939.

Biography

Early years
Travers Clement lived in Los Gatos, California during the 1930s, where he was active in the local organization of the Socialist Party of America.

Clement was an active member of the Newspaper Guild and the Sailor's Union during the 1930s.

Political career

In 1928, Clement was named the national publicity director of the American Civil Liberties Union (ACLU), a position which he retained through 1929. In that year, he became secretary of the National Mooney-Billings Committee. He remained an active member of the executive board of the ACLU's local committee in San Francisco.

Clement was the author of several pamphlets for the ACLU, as well as material dealing with the Mooney-Billings case and the Maritime Union. He was also a periodic contributor to The New Republic magazine.

Clement was elected to the governing National Executive Committee of the Socialist Party at the April 1938 convention of the organization held in Kenosha, Wisconsin. When Executive Secretary Roy E. Burt resigned early in April 1939, the NEC named Clement as the new head of day-to-day operations of the organization.

Footnotes

American socialists
California socialists
Executive Secretaries of the Socialist Party of America
People from Los Gatos, California
Socialist Party of America politicians from California